Psoralea esculenta, common name prairie turnip or timpsula, is an herbaceous perennial plant native to prairies and dry woodlands of central North America, which bears a starchy tuberous root edible as a root vegetable.  The plant is also known as Pediomelum esculentum. English names for the plant include tipsin, teepsenee, breadroot, breadroot scurf pea, large Indian breadroot, prairie potato and pomme blanche.  The prairie turnip was a staple food of the Plains Indians.

A related species, Psoralea hypogaea, the little breadroot, is also edible, although the plant and root are smaller. Another species, Psoralea argophylla, was probably harvested for food only in times of famine.

Description and range

The prairie turnip has a range on the Great Plains from Manitoba south to Texas and from Wisconsin west to Montana. It grows best in full sun on well-drained and rocky or sandy soil. The plant is referred to by the Indians of Iowa as Tipsina, the seed-bearing plant is due to climatic conditions especially in high, dry spots and can be found near rivers or in the steppe. The relative scarcity of the plant today compared to its previous abundance may be because most prairie has been converted to farmland or managed grassland.

The prairie turnip is a perennial, living 3 to more than 6 years. Harvest of the tubers is during flowering. The flowers and flower stalk break off and disappear soon after flowering, making the plant difficult to locate.

The Lakota name for the plant is Timpsula.  The name of Topeka, the capital city of Kansas, is believed to mean a "good place to dig prairie turnips" in the Kansa and other southern Siouan languages.

Harvest

Abundant under favorable conditions, palatable, and nutritious, the prairie turnip was once a wild-gathered staple food of the Plains Indians, especially the nomads, and of early European explorers. It was harvested May through July when the blooming flower stalks were easily visible among prairie grasses.  The Indians, usually women, harvested the root with a sharpened, fire-hardened digging stick. The tubers have a hard, dark skin and are peeled before eating. Some were eaten immediately, either raw or boiled, but most were dried for further use.  They were sliced and sun dried, braided and hung on meat racks to dry, and pounded into flour.

The prairie turnip was also a reliable food in times of shortage or famine.  A number of examples have been recorded of Indians and whites subsisting on the root for extended periods when other food could not be obtained. The prairie turnip is more nutritious than most root crops, containing about 7 percent protein, more than 50 percent carbohydrates, and is rich in vitamins and trace minerals.  Particularly important was the vitamin C content of 17.1 milligrams per 100 grams as the winter meat-rich diet of the Plains Indians was often deficient in vitamin C.

The prairie turnip takes 2 to 4 years to grow from seed to mature root. The long period required for maturation probably limited the success of any efforts the Indians made to cultivate the plant.  Garden plantings have been made by scientists to evaluate the potential for domestication.

Uses as food

As a food, the prairie turnip has been described variously as a "delicacy," "tolerably good eating," or "tasteless and insipid." Barry Kaye and D. W. Moodie describe the Native Americans’ use of it as food as follows: "they eat it uncooked, or they boil it, or roast it in the embers, or dry it, and crush it to powder and make soup of it. Large quantities are stored in buffalo skin bags for winter use. A sort of pudding made of the flour of the dried roots and with the serviceberries (Amelanchier alnifolia), after boiling together, is very palatable and a favorite dish."

The root can be peeled and eaten raw or cooked. The dried root can be ground into flour, and then boiled with serviceberries (Amelanchier alnifolia) to make a sweet pudding.

Prairie turnip flour is often used as a "secret ingredient" in modern Indian frybread recipes.

References

Footnotes

Citations

Works cited

External links 
 Information and habit photo

Psoraleeae
Root vegetables
Flora of Montana
Edible legumes
Flora of Minnesota
Plants used in Native American cuisine
Flora without expected TNC conservation status